This is a list of video games developed in Ireland.

References

External Links 
Game Developer Directory (from Imirt: The Irish Game Makers Association's website. They also have a news page and social media accounts. Check some Irish made games under the Resources tab.)

Ireland
Video games developed
Video games developed in Ireland